Synotis is a genus of Asian plants in the groundsel tribe within the daisy family.
The species occur mostly in the Himalayan region of southwestern China and the northern Indian Subcontinent, but a few are native to northern China.

 Species

 formerly included
see Senecio
 Synotis rhabdos -  Senecio rhabdos

References

Senecioneae
Asteraceae genera